Bob and Mike Bryan were the two-time defending champions, but they retired in August 2020 so they did not defend their titles. Ariel Behar and Gonzalo Escobar won the title, defeating Christian and Ryan Harrison in the final, 6–7(5–7), 7–6(7–4), [10–4].

Seeds

Draw

Draw

References

External Links
 Main draw

Delray Beach Open - Doubles
2021 Doubles
Delray Beach Open – Doubles
Delray Beach Open – Doubles